The following elections occurred in the year 1856.

North America

United States
 California's at-large congressional district
 1856 New York state election
 1856 and 1857 United States House of Representatives elections
 1856 United States presidential election
 1856 and 1857 United States Senate elections

South America

Chile 

 1856 Chilean presidential election

See also
 :Category:1856 elections

1856
Elections